Nicholas Dill (born 1963) is a Bermudian Anglican bishop.

Background 
Dill, one of three siblings, was born in 1963 to Nicholas Bayard Dill Jr. and his wife, Bitten ( Birgitte Brodtkorb). His mother is of Norwegian ancestry.

The Dill family has resided in Bermuda since the 1630s, and through his ancestor, Ruth Rapilje Neilson, he is a descendant of American Revolutionary War hero John Neilson as well as the Bayard and Schuyler families of New York and New Jersey. Dill is a cousin of the Academy Award-winning actor and producer Michael Douglas.

Dill studied at Saltus Grammar School and graduated from Oundle School in the UK in 1981. Dill earned a BA in history and politics from Trinity College of the University of Toronto. He earned a law degree from Queen Mary College in London in 1990.

Faith and religious service 
Dill became a committed Christian after being inspired by the faith of his older sister Karin. 

After working at Conyers Dill & Pearman, the law firm cofounded by his grandfather Bayard Dill, Dill went to the UK for theological training and was ordained as a deacon by Bishop Ewen Ratteray in 1997.

On 29 May 2013, Dill was installed as the 12th, and youngest, Anglican Bishop of Bermuda at the Cathedral of the Most Holy Trinity in Hamilton, Bermuda. He was ordained after studying at Wycliffe Hall, Oxford.

Personal life 
Dill married Fiona Campbell in 1990 and has six children.

References

21st-century Anglican bishops in Bermuda
Anglican bishops of Bermuda
Alumni of Wycliffe Hall, Oxford
Living people
Dill family
1963 births